Monteliscai is a village in Tuscany, central Italy, in the comune of Siena, province of Siena. At the time of the 2001 census its population was 67.

Monteliscai is about 9 km from Siena.

References 

Frazioni of Siena